Hermann Gottlieb Helmer (13 July 1849 – 2 April 1919) was a German architect who mainly worked in Austria.

Biography 
After completing an apprenticeship as a bricklayer, and some further education he joined the architecture firm of Ferdinand Fellner, Sr. After his death he founded the architecture studio Fellner & Helmer together with his son Ferdinand Fellner in 1873.

References 

Architects from Hamburg
Baroque Revival architects
1849 births
1919 deaths